"Release" is a song by Canadian rock band the Tea Party. It was released as a charity single in Canada and a promotional single in the US. The music video was shot in Paris and Toronto.

"Release" is a standard three-piece rock composition and with keyboard accompaniment, written after Jeff Martin watched a BBC report about the state of women's rights worldwide, the song intended as an apology to women. After the release of Transmission the band continued the sentiment by releasing a charity single to assist the White Ribbon Campaign.

Track listing 
EMI Music maxi-single CD
"Release (Tom Lord-Alge radio mix)" – 3:59
"Release (Jeff Martin mix)" – 4:15
"Temptation (Rhys Fulber mix)" – 5:50
"Save Me (Alhambra mix)" – 8:23

References 

1998 singles
Charity singles
The Tea Party songs